Great Bend is a city in and the county seat of Barton County, Kansas, United States.  It is named for its location at the point where the course of the Arkansas River bends east then southeast.  As of the 2020 census, the population of the city was 14,733.  It is home to Barton Community College.

History

Prior to American settlement of the area, the site of Great Bend was located in the northern reaches of Kiowa territory. Claimed first by France as part of Louisiana and later acquired by the United States with the Louisiana Purchase in 1803, it lay within the area organized by the U.S. as Kansas Territory in 1854. Kansas became a state in 1861, and the state government delineated the surrounding area as Barton County in 1867.

The first settlers of the area arrived in 1870. Living in sod houses and dugouts, they worked as buffalo hunters since trampling by bison herds precluded crop farming. In 1871, the Great Bend Town Company, anticipating the westward construction of the Atchison, Topeka and Santa Fe Railroad, founded Great Bend at a site roughly three miles west of Fort Zarah on the Santa Fe Trail. They named the settlement after its location at the "great bend" in the Arkansas River where the river's course turns eastward. The town began to grow as more settlers arrived over the following year and opened several businesses.

The railroad reached Great Bend in July 1872, and an election at about the same time declared the town the permanent county seat. Great Bend was incorporated as a city soon thereafter. The county courthouse and the city's first public school were built the following year.

In 1873, following the arrival of the railroad, Great Bend became a shipping point for cattle. This stimulated local business but also transformed the city into a rowdy, violent cowtown. In 1876, the Kansas Legislature extended the legal "dead line" restricting the presence of Texas cattle 30 miles west of Barton County. The cattle trade moved westward accordingly, and the city became more peaceful.

Over the following decades, Great Bend continued to grow and modernize, becoming a center of area commerce. This was despite two disasters which struck the city:  a downtown fire in 1878 and a smallpox outbreak in 1882 which resulted in a brief quarantine. In 1886, local speculators began to fund exploration for petroleum in the area. By 1930, the oil and gas industry brought more than $20 million annually to the county. More than 3,000 wells produced during the 1930s, and the influx of workers dramatically increased the city's population.

The U.S. Army Air Forces opened Great Bend Army Airfield west of the city in 1943. The base served as training facility for B-29 bomber aircraft personnel during World War II. After the war, the City of Great Bend acquired the base and repurposed it for civilian use as Great Bend Municipal Airport.

The city continued to grow through the 1950s, its population peaking at almost 17,000 in 1960. In 1973, the Fuller Brush Company relocated its production facilities to Great Bend, becoming one of the city's major employers. Despite a modest decline in population in recent decades, Great Bend continues to serve as a commercial center for central Kansas.

Geography
Great Bend is located at  (38.3644567, -98.7648073) at an elevation of 1,850 feet (564 m). It is located at the intersection of U.S. Route 281 and U.S. Route 56 highways in Kansas.

Lying in the Great Bend Sand Prairie region of the Great Plains, the city is situated on the north side of the Arkansas River where the river's course shifts from northeast to southeast. Dry Walnut Creek, a tributary of nearby Walnut Creek, flows east along the northern edge of the city.

Climate
Located near the convergence of North America's humid continental (Köppen: Dfa), humid subtropical (Köppen: Cfa), and semi-arid (Köppen: BSk) climate zones, Great Bend experiences hot summers and cold, dry winters. On average, January is the coldest month, July the hottest and May is the wettest. The hottest temperature recorded in Great Bend was 111 °F (44 °C) in 1980; the coldest temperature recorded was -21 °F (-29 °C) in 1989.

The high temperature reaches or exceeds  an average of 70 days a year and reaches or exceeds  an average of 13 days a year. The minimum temperature falls below the freezing point  an average of 112 days a year. The first fall freeze typically takes place by the third week of October, and the last spring freeze by the second week of April.

Great Bend receives  of precipitation during an average year, and there are, on average, 71 days of measurable precipitation each year. The average relative humidity is 67%. Annual snowfall averages . Measurable snowfall occurs an average of seven days a year with at least an inch of snow being received on six of those days. Snow depth of at least an inch occurs an average of 23 days a year.

Demographics

2010 census
As of the 2010 census, there were 15,995 people, 6,483 households, and 4,038 families residing in the city. The racial makeup of the city was 84.0% White, 1.7% African American, 0.6% American Indian, 0.2% Asian, 0.1% Pacific Islander, 11.0% from other races, and 2.3% from two or more races. Hispanics and Latinos of any race were 19.8% of the population.

There were 6,483 households, of which 32.2% had children under the age of 18 living with them, 47.4% were married couples living together, 10.6% had a female householder with no husband present, 4.3% had a male householder with no wife present, and 37.7% were non-families. 32.6% of all households were made up of individuals, and 13.4% had someone living alone who was 65 years of age or older. The average household size was 2.41 and the average family size was 3.04.

The median age in the city was 36.7 years. 26.2% of residents were under the age of 18; 9.2% were between the ages of 18 and 24; 23.5% were from 25 to 44; 24.5% were from 45 to 64; and 16.6% were 65 years of age or older. The gender makeup of the city was 48.5% male and 51.5% female.

As of 2010, the median income for a household was $42,293, and the median income for a family was $46,969. Males had a median income of $33,623 versus $25,038 for females. The per capita income for the city was $24,529. About 10.2% of families and 13.7% of the population were below the poverty line, including 15.7% of those under age 18 and 7.7% of those age 65 or over.

Economy
Agriculture is the predominant industry in Great Bend, and its grain elevators are visible from miles away.  The oil industry flourished from about 1930–1960.  There was even an oil well in the city park.  But this industry has been on the decline for years.  Cattle raising is also an important source of income for many people.

As of 2012, 66.5% of the population over the age of 16 were in the labor force. 0.0% were in the armed forces, and 66.5% were in the civilian labor force with 61.0% employed and 5.5% unemployed. The composition, by occupation, of the employed civilian labor force was:  30.2% in management, business, science, and arts; 27.8% in sales and office occupations; 19.2% in service occupations; 9.6% in natural resources, construction, and maintenance; 13.3% in production, transportation, and material moving. The four industries employing the largest percentages of the working civilian labor force were:  educational services, health care, and social assistance (27.3%); retail trade (11.9%); manufacturing (9.8%); and arts, entertainment, recreation, and accommodation and food services (9.8%). Great Bend Public Schools, Barton Community College, and CUNA Mutual Retirement Solutions are the city's three largest employers. Other major employers include local government, local hospitals, Wal-Mart, Superior Essex, and Fuller Brush Company.

The cost of living in Great Bend is relatively low; compared to a U.S. average of 100, the cost of living index for the city is 79.4. As of 2012, the median home value in the city was $78,300, the median selected monthly owner cost was $979 for housing units with a mortgage and $400 for those without, and the median gross rent was $539.

Government

Great Bend is a city of the second class with a mayor-council form of government. The city council consists of eight members, two elected from each city ward for two-year terms.  The mayor is elected at-large, also for a two-year term. The mayor and city council together constitute the city's Governing Body which sets goals, establishes policies, and approves all ordinances and resolutions. The council meets on the first and third Monday of each month.

As the county seat, Great Bend is the administrative center of Barton County. The county courthouse is located downtown, and most departments of the county government base their operations in the city.

Great Bend lies within Kansas's 1st U.S. Congressional District. For the purposes of representation in the Kansas Legislature, the city is located in the 33rd district of the Kansas Senate and the 112th district of the Kansas House of Representatives.

Education

Colleges
Barton Community College, a two-year public college, is located approximately three miles northeast of Great Bend.

Public schools
Great Bend USD 428 public school district serves approximately 3,000 students and operates eight schools in the city:
 Great Bend High School (9–12)
 Great Bend Middle School (7–8)
 Eisenhower Elementary School (K–6)
 Jefferson Elementary School (K–6)
 Lincoln Elementary School (K–6)
 Park Elementary School (K–6)
 Riley Elementary School (PreK-6)
 Helping Hands Preschool (PreK)

Private schools
The Roman Catholic Diocese of Dodge City oversees the Holy Family School (PreK–6). There is also one non-denominational Christian school in the city, Central Kansas Christian Academy (K-8).

Infrastructure

Transportation

Great Bend was located on the National Old Trails Road, also known as the Ocean-to-Ocean Highway, that was established in 1912. Currently, two U.S. Highways and two Kansas state highways pass through the city. U.S. Route 281 runs north–south through Great Bend, intersecting U.S. Route 56, K-96, and K-156 which run concurrently east–west through the city. K-96 splits from U.S. 56 and K-156 in western Great Bend, exiting the city to the northwest. U.S. 56 and K-156 continue concurrently west, then turn south and ultimately southwest.

Used primarily for general aviation.

A Kansas and Oklahoma Railroad line runs east–west through the city with a second line branching off to the northwest, paralleling K-96.

Utilities
The city government's Public Works Department is responsible for water distribution, waste water treatment, and sewer maintenance. One of the few cities in the area not to have a water treatment plant or water tower, Great Bend obtains its water supply directly from ten wells located throughout the city. Waste water is treated and recycled at the city's Wastewater Treatment Facility and then emptied into the Arkansas River. Two regional energy cooperatives, Midwest Energy, Inc. and Wheatland Electric, provide electric power. Local residents primarily use natural gas for heating fuel; Midwest Energy and Kansas Gas Service both provide natural gas service.

Health care
There is one primary medical facility in the city. Great Bend Regional Hospital, a 33-bed general medical and surgical facility, is the city's sole hospital. St. Rose Ambulatory & Surgery Center, formerly Central Kansas Medical Center, was an outpatient care facility affiliated with Catholic Health Initiatives.  St. Rose Ambulatory & Surgery Center was closed and demolished in 2015.

Media

The Great Bend Tribune is the city's daily newspaper with a circulation of over 6,200 copies.

The Interrobang was the student newspaper at the Great Bend-based Barton Community College.

Great Bend is a center of broadcast media for central Kansas. Two AM and ten FM radio stations are licensed to and/or broadcast from the city. Two television stations, one NBC affiliate and one ABC affiliate, also broadcast from the city. Both are satellite stations of their respective affiliates in Wichita as Great Bend is part of the Wichita-Hutchinson, Kansas television market.

Parks and recreation
The city government's Park Department maintains 10 parks in the city. The two largest are Brit Spaugh Park and Veteran's Memorial Park. Located in the north-central part of the city, Brit Spaugh Park includes the Great Bend Zoo, the Wetlands Aquatic Center, two softball fields, horseshoe courts, picnic areas, playgrounds, a skateboarding area, and a BMX track. Veteran's Park is located in the northwestern part of the city and includes an 18-hole disc golf course, a fishing lake with limited boating, sand volleyball, ballfields, a playground, and walking trails. The department also maintains hiking and biking trails along flood control levies around the city along with Stone Lake, a  fishing lake immediately south of the city.

The Club at StoneRidge, located on the northern edge of the city, includes a private, 18-hole golf course that opened in 1940.

Culture

Arts and music
From 1947 to 1989, Great Bend was the home of the Argonne Rebels Drum and Bugle Corps.  Under the direction of Glenn and Sandra Opie, the corps achieved national fame, most notably winning the American Legion national championships in 1971, 1972, and 1973.  The Rebels were one of the thirteen founding member corps of Drum Corps International, finishing in 5th place in 1972 and 11th in 1973.

Points of interest
 The Barton County Historical Society Museum and Village is located in Great Bend.
 The Great Bend Zoo and Raptor Center, founded in 1952, contains over 60 species of animals.

Sports
Greyhound racing got its start in the United States in the bottoms in 1886 during a formal coursing event.

The first nationwide NHRA sponsored event called "the Nationals" was held in 1955, in Great Bend, Kansas at the Great Bend Municipal Airport.

Notable people

Notable individuals who were born in and/or have lived in Great Bend include jazz singer and pianist Karrin Allyson (1963– ), co-inventor of the integrated circuit (IC) and 2000 Nobel Prize laureate in physics Jack Kilby (1923–2005), and 1952 gold medal-winning U.S. Olympic basketball player John Keller (1928–2000).

See also
 Great Bend Zoo
 Santa Fe Trail
 National Old Trails Road

References

Further reading

External links

 City of Great Bend
 Great Bend - Directory of Public Officials
 Barton County Historical Museum
 Great Bend city map, KDOT

Cities in Kansas
County seats in Kansas
Cities in Barton County, Kansas
Micropolitan areas of Kansas
Kansas populated places on the Arkansas River